Patrick Donnelly may refer to:

Patrick Donnelly (bishop) (1650–1716), Irish Catholic bishop known as The Bard of Armagh
Patrick Donnelly (politician) (1878–1947), Irish Parliamentary Party politician
Patrick Donnelly (poet) (born 1956), American poet
Patrick Donnelly (Irish republican), IRA member

See also
Pat Donnelly (disambiguation)